Acacia celastrifolia, commonly known as the glowing wattle, is a shrub or tree belonging to the genus Acacia and the subgenus Phyllodineae native to Western Australia.

Each phyllode has an obovate to oblanceolate or elliptic shape. It blooms from April to August and produces yellow flowers.

A. celastrifolis is part of the Acacia myrtifolia group and is also closely related to Acacia clydonophora.

It is native to an area along in the South West and the Wheatbelt regions of Western Australia.
It is found growing in sandy to gravelly lateritic or granitic soils amongst woodland or kwongan or on laterite hills as part of Eucalyptus (often Eucalyptus accedens) woodland communities.

See also
 List of Acacia species

References

celastrifolia
Acacias of Western Australia
Plants described in 1842
Taxa named by George Bentham